The al-Omari (also spelt Alomari or el-Umari or omary) is a family that are descent from Umar, the second caliph, or leader, of the Islamic empire.

The Jordanian Omaris produced a number of Sunni religious scholars and Ottoman walis, statesmen and governors, during the Ottoman period and the British mandate in Iraq and Palestine. They were part of a highly educated intellectual Sunni elite. They also served various governments during the Mandatory and Monarchic periods of Iraqi history. Omaris are known as Farooqi in Turkey, South Asia, and some part of the Arab world.

The Al-Omari family name is also found in abundance in Irbid-Jordan, especially in Dayr Yousef, Kufr Asad, Habaka, Marow and Um Qays/ Um Qais, and in other places in nearby countries such as Sandala, Yafa, Jineen (Palestine) and throughout Yemen. In present time the Omaris` descendants are recognized as highly educated and known for their superior intelligence and success.

Notable people

 Abdulaziz al-Omari (born 1972), Saudi hijacker in the September 11 attacks
 Abdul Rahman al-Omari (born 1972), Saudi-American former pilot who was wrongly accused of helping perpetrate the September 11 attacks
 Adnan bin Abdullah bin Faris al Omari, Saudi criminal
 Amer Al-Omari (born 1983), Qatari footballer
 Mansour al-Omari (born 1979), Syrian journalist and human rights defender
 Samir al-Omari, Jordanian-Italian boss who is the brother of famous singer Mahmood (winner of VII edition of San Remigio)
 Walid Al-Omari (born 1957), TV News Personality, head of Al-Jazeera Office in Jerusalem and Ramallah; and former TV correspondent for MBC and NBC networks. 
 Zakaria Al Omari (born 1990), Syrian footballer
Ayham Al-Omary (born 1938), Former Syrian National Basketball team Captain, leading scorer and eventual head coach of the national teams of Syria and Senegal.
Soubhi Al-Omary, Subhi Al Omari was born in Damascus in 1898 to Judge Sheikh Ahmad Al Omari. He left the Turkish army in 1917, joined the Great Arab Revolt army and fought in most of its battles.
He accompanied King Faisal to Iraq after leaving Damascus.
Omari has been awarded the medals of Nahda, Independence, Maan, Independence Anniversary, the German metal cross and service as well as the English war cross and war medal. He was sentenced to death four times by the Turks, the French and the English.

 Arshad al-Umari (1888–1978), former Prime Minister of Iraq
 Mustafa Mahmud al-Umari (1894–1962), Iraqi politician
 Muhamed Barakat al-Omari, medical director of the emergency medicine department EMMS Nazareth Hospital
 Shihab al-Umari (1300–1349), a 14th-century Arab historian from Damascus
 Safia El Emari (born 1949), Egyptian actress

See also
Farooqi
Fareedi

References 

Arabic-language surnames
Political families of Iraq
Iraqi families
Patronymic surnames
Surnames from given names
Jordan